Csörög is a village in Pest county, Budapest metropolitan area, Hungary. It has a population of 2,056 (2007).

References

Populated places in Pest County
Budapest metropolitan area